Ana María Fernández Planas (16 October 1968 – 15 August 2021) was a Spanish philologist and phonetician from Catalonia.

Biography
Ana Maria Fernández Planas was born in Blanes on 16 October 1968. After earning a doctorate in linguistics from the University of Barcelona (UB), ​​she began her research in the field of articulatory phonetics in Spanish and Catalan. In 1984, she became coordinator of the journal . She was a professor of linguistics at UB, and in 1998 she became the technical manager of its Phonetics Laboratory. In 2018, she received the Antoni Caparrós Award from the Bosch i Gimpera Foundation and UB for best knowledge transfer project.

She was one of the pioneers in the introduction of electropalatography in Spain. Among her most outstanding scientific contributions is the calculation of the values of the perceptual thresholds of duration and the fundamental frequency in Spanish.

Ana María Fernández Planas died in Blanes on 15 August 2021.

Selected works
 Así se habla. Nociones fundamentales de fonética general y española (2005), Horsori

References

External links
 Ana Ma. Fernández Planas at the University of Barcelona

1968 births
2021 deaths
21st-century linguists
People from Selva
Philologists from Catalonia
Phoneticians
University of Barcelona alumni
Academic staff of the University of Barcelona
Women philologists